is originally a four tankōbon manga (inspired by the homonymous book) created by Go Nagai and Kunio Nagatani and published by Tokuma Shoten in 1990. It was later adapted into an OVA, known in the United Kingdom as Kamasutra and in the United States as Kama Sutra and considered a hentai anime in the West.

Plot
Prof. Takeshi Aikawa is researching the location of an ancient Indian princess, Princess Surya of Gupta Empire. Prof. Aikawa's grandson, Ryu, becomes involved when the group of gangster attacking Ryu and his spoiled girlfriend Yukari and ransacks his grandfather's apartment in search for information about the princess until Ryu witnessed as he discovered the manuscript which actually was an ancient Indian sex manual called Kamasutra. Ryu goes to India to help his grandfather. There, he finds his grandfather's assistant, Shakti, who introduces him to learn the techniques which found in Kamasutra.

Ryu and Shakti flight towards to Prof. Aikawa locations, however, they're kidnapped by the same gangsters who are working for an ancient Indian cult, the Naga Tribe, and soon takes them into the Palace of Naga. Ryu is sexually drained and physically debilitated while in captivity, but his grandfather and adventurous Indy Yakko manage to save them. Afterward, Prof. Aikawa's group goes to Khajuraho Temple to find a golden cup-like artifact called the Sex Grail, which is sealed inside of Rama's sculpture and with it they able to locate and retrieve the frozen princess Surya, who was resting at Himalayas, with using the grail to revive Surya from suspended animated state.

Meanwhile, having failed at obtaining the grail, the person behind the attacks, the Old Master, dies and his son, Prince Rudra assumes the leadership for the tribe, and raping Jody, the Old Master's personal doctor in the process. He then personally kidnaps Surya with the intention of obtaining her love juice to be used with the grail. Rudra then tries to obtain the grail and succeeds by deceiving Ryu into an exchange of the princess for the grail. After obtaining the grail (and kidnapping Ryu in the process), he sends his henceman, Hige Godzilla to trick Yukari into raping Surya for them. Yukari does so and is also captured and is jailed along with Ryu before they are crushed and stuck by a wall trap. Yakko, however, is able to track them down and rescues them. While trying to escape, they're confronted by Rudra, who uses his mystical power to attacking them, but they still escape.

Prince Rudra, now in possession of the Sex Grail and forced to married princess Surya, as they proceed with the wedding ceremony, however, they're interrupted by the attack of Captain Austin, an American soldier and Jody's father, who came to take a revenge on Rudra for raped his daughter. He manages to escape by the Boat of Garuda along with Surya and the grail, but is soon followed by Austin, Prof. Aikawa, Yakko and Ryu. With help of the Sex Grail, Rudra opens a portal to enter them into the earthly paradise of Shambhala which hidden inside the waterfall, he is soon followed by Ryu and Yakko with help of Captain Austin. As they entering to Shambhala, Ryu and Yakko find a giant golden egg-shaped vessel, the Sacred Egg, floating like a sun, they continued to rescue Surya.

In the meantime, Prof. Aikawa goes to Khajuraho once again to finds another way of entering to Shambhala along with Shakti, Yukari and Hige, by using the grail counterpart, the Cup of Death, and join them in a foursome position which similarly to Khajuraho's erotic sculpture. As prince Rudra and princess Surya enter the Sacred Egg, Prof. Aikawa and his allies (who's shown naked in foursome position) appear before him. Soon after, Ryu and Yakko also arrive and Ryu manages to catching Rudra just as he enters the egg with Surya, in which the grail falls outside the egg, just as the Sacred Egg elevates itself and fly towards into the space.

As Rudra and Ryu engage in fight, they're interrupted by the group of celestial angels who reside the egg, they give Ryu and Rudra a final task to performed in group sex based on the Kamasutra, as only one can be together with Surya. Ryu decides that he wants to do it with her, and so Rudra takes out from the egg by a Nāga-like creature, killing him. As angels disappear, leave only Surya and Ryu and they both have sex in eternal pleasure. Having fulfilled its purpose, the Sacred Egg now split in two, one takes Ryu and the other Surya, and then fall down to Earth.

By this time, Prof. Aikawa, Yakko, Shakti, Yukari and Hige manages to get all of them back from Shambhala to Earth using the Boat of Garuda with the help of the Sex Grail. As they return, Prof. Aikawa's group saw the two Sacred Egg, the one fall into a river and Ryu released while Surya still inside the other, floating in the sky. Surya lying in fetal position to eternal sleep, fulfilled her promises with him, as a result, the Sacred Egg gets smaller and attaches itself into the grail. Afterward, the next day, the Sex Grail and the Sacred Egg now is then returned to its original place, with Surya (and Ryu's DNA) inside and sealed into the sculpture, while Ryu and his group leave from India and returned to Japan in safely.

Characters
: The hero of the story, a handsome but sexually inexperienced young man. During the course of the story he is taught in the Kamasutra so that he can conquer the final task. In the anime, he is the reincarnation of Gopal, a knight that protected princess Surya.
: An immortal ancient Indian princess who holds the secret of eternal life. In the anime, she knows Ryu from his past life.
He was a navy Lieutenant until he assumes the role of leader of the Naga Tribe. In the anime, it is implied that he is the reincarnation of Ryu's killer.
: Prof. Aikawa assistant and lover. She is the first to introduce Ryu into the art of the Kamasutra. Her real name known as Irene Adoldo
: Ryu's grandfather and the archaeologist behind the discovery of princess Surya. In the manga he constantly engages in sexual acts with Shakti.
 a spoiled yet sassy girl who is Ryu's girlfriend.
: An adventurer who's parody of Indiana Jones and comic relief. He successfully helps Ryu during the course of the story. His real name known as Hiya Yakko
: The character from the Yadamon manga and Harenchi Gakuen. In this story, he is helping the Naga tribe and acts as the main henchman/servant of the prince.
: An ill, disfigured old man with snake-like voice, and the former leader of the Naga Tribe who seeking the secret of the "Sex Grail" and ancient Princess Surya. He is the father of the prince and is called also Beshuma.

Media

Manga
The manga was published in four volumes by Tokuma Shoten.

Anime
The OVA adaptation, titled , was released on April 24, 1992.

The anime was released in a subtitled version VHS in the United Kingdom on April 11, 1994 by Western Connection. Western Connection also released it in DVD.

In the United States, it was originally released by Kitty Media on May 5, 1998 in two versions, an edited "general release" and an unedited version. Kitty Media also released the OVA in DVD on January 28, 2003, this time including English dubbed audio.

References

External links
Kamasutra at the World of Go Nagai website 

Kyukioku no Sex Adventure Kamasutra at allcinema 

1990 manga
1992 anime OVAs
Go Nagai
Hentai anime and manga
Comics set in India
Television shows set in India
Television shows set in Madhya Pradesh
Khajuraho